The Industrial Development & Renovation Organization of Iran (IDRO) known as IDRO Group was established in 1967 in Iran. IDRO Group is one of the largest companies in Iran. It is also one of the largest conglomerates in Asia. IDRO's objective is to develop Iran's industry sector and to accelerate the industrialization process of the country and to export Iranian products worldwide. Today, IDRO owns 117 subsidiaries and affiliated companies both domestically as well as internationally.

Businesses 

In the course of its 40 years of activity, IDRO has gradually become a major shareholder of some key industries in Iran. In recent years and in accordance with the country's privatization policy, IDRO has made great efforts to privatize its affiliated companies. While carrying on its privatization policies and lessening its role as a holding company, IDRO intends to concentrate on its prime missions and to turn into an industrial development agency.
IDRO has focused its activities on the following areas in order to materialize such strategy and to expedite the industrial development of Iran:

Promotion of local and foreign investments with minority holdings owned by IDRO (less than 50% of the shares) with particular emphasis on new, hi-tech and export-oriented industries.
Restructuring the existing industries through participation of reputable foreign companies in order to transfer new technologies and to enhance the non-oil exports of Iran.
Development of general contracting activities with the participation of the Iranian private sector and credible foreign companies.
Rendering consultancy and support services to foreign investors.
Privatization of the existing subsidiaries.
Industrial Investment
Management Development
Automotive Industry
Industrial Equipment Machinery
Marine Industry
Railway Industry
Hi-Tech Industries Development
General Contracting
Health care
Banking

Privatization

IDRO had privatized 140 of its companies worth about 2,000 billion rials ($200 million) in the past. The organization will offer shares of 150 industrial units to private investors by March 2010. In 2009, 290 companies were under the control of the IDRO.

Subsidiaries

This is a list of IDRO's main subsidiaries (as of 2008):

See also
Economy of Iran
IMIDRO
Industry of Iran
International rankings of Iran
Iranian automobile industry
Iranian railway industry
List of Iranian companies
National Iranian Oil Company
National Iranian Petrochemical Company
Privatization in Iran
Science and technology in Iran
Geological Survey and Mineral Exploration of Iran

References

External links
 IDRO's official website
 IDRO annual report (2008/09)
 IDRO annual report (2003)

Government-owned companies of Iran
Companies
Economy of Iran
Industrial development agencies
Conglomerate companies of Iran
Life sciences industry
Manufacturing companies based in Tehran
Ministry of Industry, Mine and Trade (Iran)
Iranian entities subject to the U.S. Department of the Treasury sanctions